Incident in Judaea is a British film made by Paul Bryers, based on the novel The Master and Margarita by the Soviet author Mikhail Bulgakov. The film only tells the biblical parts of the novel though. It was broadcast by the British Channel 4 on 31 March 1991.

Background
Author and director Paul Bryers wrote and directed many factually-based dramas for television, radio and theatre and adapted and directed films by outstanding playwrights such as Arthur Miller and Mikhail Bulgakov. His TV-film Incident in Judaea was the first real drama Paul Bryers ever directed and it's still one of the best experiences he's had as a director. Bryers got a budget of £230,000, which was not much, but he could work with star actors like John Woodvine, Lee Montague and Mark Rylance.

Story
In the novel The Master and Margarita by the Russian author Mikhail Bulgakov, on which the film is based, three story lines are interwoven: a satirical story line in which Satan, called Woland here, goes to the city of Moscow in the 1930s to deal in hilarious manner with the corrupt lucky ones, bureaucrats and profiteers from the Stalin era, a second one describing the internal struggle fought by Pontius Pilate before, during and after the conviction and execution of Yeshua Ha Nozri (Jesus from Nazareth), and a third one telling the story of the love between the master, an unnamed writer in Moscow during the 1930s and his beloved Margarita, which goes to the extreme to save her master. The master has written a novel about Pontius Pilate, and is addressed by the authorities because this was an issue which in the officially atheistic Soviet Union was taboo.

Differences from the novel
The film Incident in Judaea only tells the biblical story of the novel: the story of Pontius Pilate and Yeshua Ha Nozri (Jesus from Nazareth), but follows faithfully the story and the dialogues. The film starts with the first paragraph of Chapter 2 of the novel: "In a white cloak with blood-red lining, with the shuffling gait of a cavalryman, early in the morning of the fourteenth day of the spring month of Nisan, there came out to the covered colonnade between the two wings of the palace of Herod the Great' the procurator of Judaea, Pontius Pilate".

Cast
Yeshua Ha-Nozri: Mark Rylance 
Pontius Pilate: John Woodvine 
Marcus Ratslayer: Jonathon McKenna
Matthew Levi: Frank Baker
Aphranius: Jim Carter
Judas from Kiriath: Jason Carter
Joseph Kaifa: Lee Montague 
Niza: Rosalind Bennett

Soundtrack
Original music score by Debbie Wiseman

Other screen adaptations of The Master and Margarita
Charlotte Waligòra - Le maître et Marguerite - 2017 (film)
Giovanni Brancale - Il Maestro e Margherita - 2008 (film)
Vladimir Bortko - Master i Margarita - 2005 (TV series)
Ibolya Fekete - A Mester és Margarita - 2005 (film)
Sergey Desnitsky - Master i Margarita - 1996 (film)
Yuri Kara - Master i Margarita - 1994 (film)
Paul Bryers - Incident in Judea - 1991 (TV-film)
Oldřich Daněk - Pilát Pontský, onoho dne - 1991 (film)
Andras Szirtes - Forradalom Után - 1990 (film)
Aleksandr Dzekun  - Master i Margarita - 1989 (TV series)
Vladimir Vasilyev and Boris Yermolaev - Fuete - 1986 (film)
Aleksandar Petrović - Il Maestro e Margherita - 1972 (film)
Andrzej Wajda - Pilate and Others - 1972 (TV-film)
Seppo Wallin - Pilatus - 1970 (TV-film)

To be expected
Logos Film Company - The Master and Margarita - 2018  (film)  
Katariina Lillqvist - Mistr a Markétka - 2013 (animation film)
Nikolai Lebedev  - Master i Margarita - 2019 (film)

Sources

External links
 
 Incident in Judea  on the Master & Margarita website

British television films
Films based on The Master and Margarita
Portrayals of Jesus on television
Cultural depictions of Judas Iscariot
Cultural depictions of Pontius Pilate
1991 films